Adelphia College was a Swedish-American college in Seattle, Washington, run by the Swedish Baptist Church. The institution opened in 1905, but went bankrupt in 1918 or 1919. 

In 1919, the main building and campus were sold to the Jesuit Seattle College (the later Seattle University); the campus has since 1930 been used by a related Jesuit institution, the Seattle Preparatory School.

The remaining archives of the college are kept in the Swenson Center at Augustana College (Illinois).

Adelphia Bible College
In 2011 the school reopened at Lake Retreat Camp and Conference Center in Ravensdale Washington as Adelphia Bible College (also known as Adelphia Bible School). Lake Retreat Camp is part of Converge Northwest Swedish Baptist Church. The Bible school provides intentional, focused time exploring a student's strengths, identifying gifts and abilities, developing vital life skills, and equipping for faith and mission. Adelphia graduates may pursue further education at a university, some will enter the workforce, and many will devote their time in volunteer or vocational ministry.

External links
 Adelphia Bible College - Revived 2011 (School website)
Washington Historic Sites (Bethel University website)
 Archives of Adelphia College at the Swenson Center
 Image search from the University of Washington digital collection

1905 establishments in Washington (state)
Educational institutions established in 1905
Defunct universities and colleges in Washington (state)